Symphorema is a genus of plants in the family Lamiaceae, first described in 1805. It is native to Asia.

Species
Symphorema involucratum Roxb. - India, Sri Lanka, Andaman Islands, Myanmar, Thailand, Yunnan
Symphorema luzonicum (Blanco) Fern.-Vill.  - Java, Maluku, Philippines
Symphorema polyandrum Wight - India

References

Lamiaceae
Lamiaceae genera